The provinces of Mozambique are divided into 128 districts. The districts are listed below, by province:

Cabo Delgado Province
Ancuabe District
Balama District
Chiúre District
Ibo District
Macomia District
Mecúfi District
Meluco District
Mocímboa da Praia District 
Montepuez District
Mueda District
Muidumbe District
Namuno District
Nangade District 
Palma District
Pemba-Metuge District
Quissanga District

Gaza Province
Bilene Macia District
Chibuto District
Chicualacuala District
Chigubo District
Chókwè District
Guijá District 
Mabalane District
Manjacaze District
Massangena District
Massingir District
Xai-Xai District

Inhambane Province
Funhalouro District
Govuro District
Homoine District 
Inharrime District
Inhassoro District 
Jangamo District 
Mabote District
Massinga District
Morrumbene District
Panda District
Vilanculos District
Zavala District

Manica Province
Báruè District
Gondola District
 Guro District
Machaze District
Macossa District
Manica District
Mossurize District
Sussundenga District
Tambara District

Maputo City
Maputo

Maputo Province
Boane District
Magude District
Manhiça District
Marracuene District
Matutuíne District
Moamba District
Namaacha District

Nampula Province
Angoche District
Eráti District
Lalaua District
Malema District
Meconta District
Mecubúri District
Memba District
Mogincual District
Mogovolas District
Moma District
Monapo District
Mossuril District
Muecate District
Murrupula District
Nacala-a-Velha District
Nacarôa District
Nampula District
Ribáuè District

Niassa Province
Cuamba District
Lago District
Lichinga District
Majune District
Mandimba District
Marrupa District
Maúa District
Mavagoago District
Mecanhelas District
Mecula District
Metarica District
Muembe District
N'gauma District
Nipepe District
Sanga District

Sofala Province
Buzi District
Caia District
Chemba District
Cheringoma District
Chibabava District
Dondo District
Gorongosa District
Marromeu District
Machanga District
Maringué District
Muanza District
Nhamatanda District

Tete Province
Angónia District
Cahora-Bassa District
Changara District
Chifunde District
Chiuta District
Doa District
Macanga District
Magoé District
Marávia District
Moatize District
Mutarara District
Tsangano District
Zumbo District

Zambezia Province
Alto Molocue District
Chinde District
Gilé District
Gurué District
Ile District
Inhassunge District
Lugela District
Maganja da Costa District
Milange District
Mocuba District
Mopeia District
Morrumbala District
Namacurra District
Namarroi District
Nicoadala District
Pebane District

External links
 Districts of Mozambique, Statoids.com

 
Subdivisions of Mozambique
Mozambique, Districts
Mozambique 2
Districts, Mozambique
Mozambique geography-related lists